KTNF (950 kHz, AM 950) is a commercial AM radio station licensed to St. Louis Park, Minnesota that serves the Minneapolis-St. Paul metropolitan area. The station brands itself as "The Progressive Voice of Minnesota," and offers a combination of locally produced and nationally syndicated progressive talk programming.  It is owned by JR Broadcasting.

KTNF's studios and transmitter are located on Valley View Road in Eden Prairie.  It operates with 1,000 watts around the clock, using a directional antenna, with a two-tower pattern by day and a three-tower pattern at night.

Syndicated hosts heard on KTNF include Stephanie Miller, Thom Hartmann, Amy Goodman and Mike Papantonio. Westwood One News and AP Radio News provides news broadcasts at the top of the hour.

History
On May 13, 1958, the station signed on as KRSI.  It was owned by Radio Suburbia and its studios were located at 4500 Excelsior Blvd. in St. Louis Park.  On July 1, 1962, it started an FM sister station at 104.1 MHz, which, following many format changes, is now KZJK. At one point, both stations were owned by Red Owl Stores. In October 1972, the two stations moved to what is now the AM station's current studio and transmitter facility in Eden Prairie.

The 950 AM frequency has been home to many formats. KRSI was one of the first Top-40 stations in the Twin Cities in the late 1950s.  While it was owned by Roy H. Park, KRSI carried one of its most popular formats, simulcasting with 104.1 KRSI-FM as Top 40 "All Request Radio," between 1968 and 1972.

Over the years the station has been through many formats, including:

 MOR format "Music You Remember" (1958-1968)
 Top 40 as "Request Radio" (1968-1973) (began 24-hour operation)
 Country music (Automated Drake-Chenault "Great American Country") (1973-1979)
 Rock/new wave ("Musicradio I-95") (1979-1980)
 Adult standards (Music of Your Life, simulcast with KRSI-FM)  (February 1980 – 1982)
 Country music (SMN "County Coast To Coast") (1982-1984)
 CHR (SMN "Rock America") "Hot Rock 950 KRSI" (1984-1985)
 Oldies "Request Radio" (1985-1986)
 Simulcast with FM as KJJO (1986-1988)
 Urban AC (SMN "Heart And Soul") (1988)
 Hard rock (Satellite Music Networks' "Z-Rock") as KZOW (1988-1990)
 Business Radio Network (KJJO) (1990-1992)
 Simulcast with FM (KJJO/KMJZ) (1992-1995)
 R&B oldies as KSGS ("ABC Solid Gold Soul" w/Local AM Drive) ("9-5-0 Solid Gold Soul") (1995-1999)
 Urban Adult Contemporary (ABC "The Touch" w/Local AM Drive) (1999-2001)
 Business Radio as KDOW, then KCCO ("Business 9-5-0") (2001-2004)
 Talk as KSNB (2004-)

AM 950 simulcast with co-owned 104.1 during a number of periods in its history.

The station was running a combination format of news, sports and business news (as KDOW, KCCO, then KSNB) when it was sold by previous owner CBS Radio in 2004. The company that purchased KTNF was founded by Minnesota attorney Janet Robert and former Minnesota Congressman Bill Luther in November 2003, as a result of their concern about the impact right wing talk radio had in the 2002 elections and inspired by Sydney Blumenthal's book The Rise of the Counter-Establishment: The Conservative Ascent to Political Power. When Air America Radio made its debut on March 31, 2004, WMNN, where the group leased airtime, became one of the new network's original affiliates with Al Franken's show, as well as Democracy Radio's Ed Schultz. Eventually, more syndicated and local shows were added. After the sale of WMNN six months later, the format split to broadcasting on both 740 AM and 1530 AM. In October 2004, 950 AM was purchased, and became the permanent home of "Air America Minnesota".

In the summer of 2004, the station was purchased by Janet Robert, former Democratic-Farmer-Labor candidate for the US House of Representatives, to provide a local outlet for syndicated programming from the former Air America Radio network (the station was originally known as "Air America Minnesota").

The station procured some programs from Dial Global, which syndicated The Stephanie Miller Show and The Bill Press Show.  Along the way, Air America filed for Chapter 11 bankruptcy, reorganizing under new investors.  By the time Al Franken launched his Senate campaign in 2007, Air America was KTNF's source for The Thom Hartmann Show and a handful of weekend programs. Air America ceased operations in January 2010.

The station's ownership transitioned in October 2013 to long time employee Chad Larson. Branded as "AM950 The Progressive Voice of Minnesota" the station is the only Progressive Talk Radio station in Minnesota. The station broadcasts national programs including Thom Hartmann, Stephanie Miller, Norman Goldman, Amy Goodman, David Pakman and Brad Friedman. Local weekday drive time programming includes the Matt McNeil Show and Native Roots Radio. AM950 receives its funding through paid advertisements and listener donations.

Former Logos

References

External links
KTNF official website

Radiotapes.com Airchecks of KRSI and other historical data about the station
Randi Rhodes
Stephanie Miller Show
Thom Hartmann

Nationwide Communications
News and talk radio stations in the United States
Progressive talk radio
Radio stations in Minnesota
Radio stations established in 1958
1958 establishments in Minnesota